The 1969 NAIA Soccer Championship was the 11th annual tournament held by the NAIA to determine the national champion of men's college soccer among its members in the United States.

Eastern Illinois defeated defending champions Davis & Elkins in the final, 1–0 after two overtime periods, to claim the Panthers' first NAIA national title.

The final was  played at Earlham College in Richmond, Indiana.

Qualification

The tournament field remained fixed at eight teams.

Bracket

See also  
 1969 NCAA Soccer Championship

References 

NAIA championships
NAIA
1969 in sports in Indiana